Anthony Cox (born October 24, 1954) is an American jazz bass player. He is known for his work with several leading musicians including Geri Allen, Dewey Redman, Dave Douglas, John Scofield, Pat Metheny, Gary Thomas, Marty Ehrlich, Ed Blackwell, Joe Lovano, and Dave King.

Early life 
Cox grew up in Minneapolis and attended college at the University of Wisconsin–Eau Claire.

Career 
Cox plays mainly in the post-bop, avant-garde, and traditional styles, though has been described as "versatile enough to work in any style effectively." Peter Madsen wrote that Cox is "open to all kinds of great music from around the world" and that "his bass sound is full of beauty and warmth and his ability to accompany and still add very creative ideas into whatever music he is playing is remarkable. He is equally comfortable playing chord changes with a Stan Getz or Kenny Wheeler or playing open music with a Dewey Redman or Geri Allen."

Discography

As leader/co-leader
 Third Kind of Blue (Minor Music, 1986), trio with John Purcell and Ronnie Burrage
 Falling Man (Muse, 1989), duo with Marty Ehrlich
 Dark Metals (Polygram, 1992), with Dewey Redman, Michael Cain and Billy Higgins
 Factor of Faces (Minor Music, 1993), with Bobby Franceschini, Michael Cain and Ralph Peterson Jr.
 Ríos (Intuition, 1995), trio with Dino Saluzzi and David Friedman 
 Work (Sketch, 2002), trio with Steve Lacy and Daniel Humair
 That and This (Sketch, 2002), solo bass

As sideman
With Geri Allen
 The Printmakers (Minor Music, 1985)
 Maroons (Blue Note, 1992)
With Uri Caine
 Sphere Music (JMT, 1993)
With Andrew Cyrille
 X Man (Soul Note, 1994)
With David Friedman
 Shades of Change (Enja, 1986), with Geri Allen and Ronnie Burrage
 Other Worlds (Intuition, 1997), trio with Jean-Louis Matinier 
With Craig Harris
 Shelter (JMT 1987)
 Blackout in the Square Root of Soul (JMT, 1989)
With Joe Lovano
 Quartets: Live at the Village Vanguard (Blue Note, 1994)
 Sounds of Joy (Enja, 1991)
With the Ron Miles Quartet
 Laughing Barrel (Sterling Circle, 2003), with Brandon Ross and Rudy Royston 	
With James Newton
 If Love (Jazzline, 1990)
With Mike Nock
 Not We But One (Naxos Jazz, 1997)
With Jim Pepper
 Afro Indian Blues (PAO, 2006), with Amina Claudine Myers and Leopoldo FlemingWith Bobby Previte Weather Clear, Track Fast (Enja, 1991)
 Hue and Cry (Enja, 1993)With Dewey Redman African Venus (Evidence, 1992)With Sam Rivers' Rivbea Orchestra Jazzbühne Berlin '82 (Repertoire, 1990)With John Scofield Flat Out (Gramavision, 1989)With Rory Stuart Hurricane (Sunnyside, 1987)With Gary Thomas By Any Means Necessary (JMT, 1989)
 While the Gate Is Open (JMT, 1990)
 The Kold Kage (JMT, 1991)
 Till We Have Faces (JMT, 1992)With Gust William Tsilis Pale Fire (Enja, 1988), Alithea with Allen Farnham, Arto Tuncboyaciyan, Horacee Arnold feat. Arthur Blythe
 Possibilities (Ken, 1991), quartet with Peter Madsen and Billy HartWith Jack Walrath'In Europe (SteepleChase, 1982)A Plea for Sanity (Stash, 1982)Jack Walrath Quintet at Umbria Jazz Festival, Vol. 1 (Red, 1983 [1985])Jack Walrath Quintet at Umbria Jazz Festival, Vol. 2 (Red, 1983 [1985])Master of Suspense (Blue Note, 1987)Neohippus (Blue Note, 1988)Out of the Tradition (Muse, 1990 [1992])Gut Feelings'' (Muse, 1990 [1992])

References 

1954 births
Living people
American jazz double-bassists
Male double-bassists
American jazz bass guitarists
University of Wisconsin–Eau Claire alumni
Muse Records artists
Guitarists from Minnesota
Alessa Records artists
American male bass guitarists
20th-century American bass guitarists
Jazz musicians from Minnesota
21st-century double-bassists
20th-century American male musicians
21st-century American male musicians
American male jazz musicians